Albert C. Smith may refer to:

 Albert Charles Smith (1906–1999), American botanist
 Albert C. Smith (general) (1894–1974), officer in the United States Army

See also
 Albert Smith (disambiguation)
 A. C. Smith (disambiguation)